A tree plantation, forest plantation, plantation forest, timber plantation or tree farm is a forest planted for high volume production of wood, usually by planting one type of tree as a monoculture forest. The term tree farm also is used to refer to tree nurseries and Christmas tree farms.

Plantation forestry can produce a high volume of wood in a short period of time. Plantations are grown by state forestry authorities (for example, the Forestry Commission in Britain) and/or the paper and wood industries and other private landowners (such as Weyerhaeuser, Rayonier and Sierra Pacific Industries in the United States or Asia Pulp & Paper in Indonesia). Christmas trees are often grown on plantations, and in southern and southeastern Asia, teak plantations have recently replaced the natural forest. 
Industrial plantations are actively managed for the commercial production of forest products. Industrial plantations are usually large-scale. Individual blocks are usually even-aged and often consist of just one or two species. These species can be exotic or indigenous. The plants used for the plantation are often genetically altered for desired traits such as growth and resistance to pests and diseases in general and specific traits, for example in the case of timber species, volumic wood production and stem straightness. Forest genetic resources are the basis for genetic alteration. Selected individuals grown in seed orchards are a good source for seeds to develop adequate planting material.

Wood production on a tree plantation is generally higher than that of natural forests. While forests managed for wood production commonly yield between 1 and 3 cubic meters per hectare per year, plantations of fast-growing species commonly yield between 20 and 30 cubic meters or more per hectare annually; a Grand Fir plantation in Scotland has a growth rate of 34 cubic meters per hectare per year (Aldhous & Low 2020), and Monterey Pine plantations in southern Australia can yield up to 40 cubic meters per hectare per year (Everard & Fourt 1974). In 2000, while plantations accounted for 5% of global forest, it is estimated that they supplied about 35% of the world's roundwood.

Growth cycle 

In the first year, the ground is prepared usually by the combination of burning, herbicide spraying, and/or cultivation and then saplings are planted by human crew or by machine. The saplings are usually obtained in bulk from industrial nurseries, which may specialize in selective breeding in order to produce fast growing disease- and pest-resistant strains.
 In the first few years until the canopy closes, the saplings are looked after, and may be dusted or sprayed with fertilizers or pesticides until established.
 After the canopy closes, with the tree crowns touching each other, the plantation is becoming dense and crowded, and tree growth is slowing due to competition. This stage is termed 'pole stage'. When competition becomes too intense (for pine trees, when the live crown is less than a third of the tree's total height), it is time to thin out the section. There are several methods for thinning, but where topography permits, the most popular is 'row-thinning', where every third or fourth or fifth row of trees is removed, usually with a harvester. Many trees are removed, leaving regular clear lanes through the section so that the remaining trees have room to expand again. The removed trees are delimbed, forwarded to the forest road, loaded onto trucks, and sent to a mill. A typical pole stage plantation tree is 7–30 cm in diameter at breast height (dbh). Such trees are sometimes not suitable for timber, but are used as pulp for paper and particleboard, and as chips for oriented strand board.
 As the trees grow and become dense and crowded again, the thinning process is repeated. Depending on growth rate and species, trees at this age may be large enough for timber milling; if not, they are again used as pulp and chips.
 Around year 10-60 the plantation is now mature and (in economic terms) is falling off the back side of its growth curve. That is to say, it is passing the point of maximum wood growth per hectare per year, and so is ready for the final harvest. All remaining trees are felled, delimbed, and taken to be processed.
 The ground is cleared, and the cycle can be restarted.

Some plantation trees, such as pines and eucalyptus, can be at risk of fire damage because their leaf oils and resins are highly flammable. Conversely, an afflicted plantation can in some cases be cleared of pest species cheaply through the use of a prescribed burn, which kills all lesser plants but does not significantly harm the mature trees.

Types

Christmas tree farms

Eucalyptus

Teak

Tree farming and climate change 
A forest sequesters carbon in its trees. The forest removes carbon dioxide from the air as trees grow and returns it to the air as trees die and rot or burn. As long as the forest is experiencing net growth, the forest is reducing the amount of carbon dioxide, the leading greenhouse gas, from the air. Furthermore, if timber is regularly removed from the forest and turned into lasting wood products, those products continue sequestering carbon, while the replacement tree farm trees absorb more carbon dioxide, thus effecting a continuous reduction in greenhouse gas.

Because tree farms are managed to enhance rapid growth, a tree farm tends to sequester carbon more quickly than an unmanaged forest, considering only the sequestration side of the equation and not the carbon release due to rot, fire, or harvest. The fact that managed woodlands tend to
be younger and younger trees grow faster and die less contributes to this distinction.

Forests continue to absorb atmospheric carbon for centuries if left undisturbed.

The USDA has an online calculator for how much carbon is sequestered in various types of forests.

and forest health
The studies showed that the pines did indeed grow faster and stronger. They were also less prone to damage during ice storms, which is a factor that limits loblolly growth farther north. The forest did relatively better during dry years. The hypothesis is that the limiting factors in the growth of the pines are nutrients such as nitrogen, which is in deficit on much of the pine land in the Southeast. In dry years, however, the trees do not bump up against those factors since they are growing more slowly because water is the limiting factor. When rain is plentiful trees reach the limits of the site's nutrients and the extra  is not beneficial.
Most forest soils in Southeastern region are deficient in nitrogen and phosphorus as well as trace minerals. Pine forests often sit on land that was used for cotton, corn or tobacco. Since these crops depleted originally shallow and infertile soils, tree farmers must work to improve soils.

In addition to better fertilization, biosolids present an innovative solution. Biosolids are treated sewage from municipal or agricultural sources such as chicken and hog operations in Virginia and North Carolina. Though biosolids have the potential to improve soils and lead to improved tree growth, barriers to adoption include regulation and inertia.

Natural forest loss 
Many forestry experts claim that the establishment of plantations will reduce or eliminate the need to exploit natural forest for wood production. In principle this is true because due to the high productivity of plantations less land is needed. Many point to the example of New Zealand, where 19% of the forest area provides 99% of the supply of industrial round wood. It has been estimated that the world's demand for fiber could be met by just 5% of the world forest (Sedjo & Botkin 1997). However, in practice, plantations are replacing natural forest, for example in Indonesia. According to the FAO, about 7% of the natural closed forest being lost in the tropics is land being converted to plantations. The remaining 93% of the loss is land being converted to agriculture and other uses. Worldwide, an estimated 15% of plantations in tropical countries are established on closed canopy natural forest.

In the Kyoto Protocol, there are proposals encouraging the use of plantations to reduce carbon dioxide levels (though this idea is being challenged by some groups on the grounds that the sequestered CO2 is eventually released after harvest).

Ownership 

As of 2019, an estimated 49% of forests in the United States are owned by families.

Notable corporations include Greenwood Resources, which is owned by TIAA-CREF.

Criticisms of plantations 
In contrast to a naturally regenerated forest, plantations are typically grown as even-aged monocultures, primarily for timber production.

 Plantations are usually near- or total monocultures. That is, the same species of tree is planted across a given area, whereas a natural forest would contain a far more diverse range of tree species.
 Plantations may include tree species that would not naturally occur in the area. They may include unconventional types such as hybrids, and genetically modified trees may be used sometime in the future. Since the primary interest in plantations is to produce wood or pulp, the types of trees found in plantations are those that are best-suited to industrial applications. For example, pine, spruce and eucalyptus are widely planted far beyond their natural range because of their fast growth rate, tolerance of rich or degraded agricultural land and potential to produce large volumes of raw material for industrial use.
 Plantations are always young forests in ecological terms. Typically, trees grown in plantations are harvested after 10 to 60 years, rarely up to 120 years. This means that the forests produced by plantations do not contain the type of growth, soil or wildlife typical of old-growth natural forest ecosystems. Most conspicuous is the absence of decaying dead wood, a crucial component of natural forest ecosystems.

In the 1970s, Brazil began to establish high-yield, intensively managed, short rotation plantations. These types of plantations are sometimes called fast-wood plantations or fiber farms and often managed on a short-rotation basis, as little as 5 to 15 years. They are becoming more widespread in South America, Asia and other areas. The environmental and social impacts of this type of plantation has caused them to become controversial. In Indonesia, for example, large multi-national pulp companies have harvested large areas of natural forest without regard for regeneration. From 1980 to 2000, about 50% of the 1.4 million hectares of pulpwood plantations in Indonesia have been established on what was formerly natural forest land.

The replacement of natural forest with tree plantations has also caused social problems. In some countries, again, notably Indonesia, conversions of natural forest are made with little regard for rights of the local people. Plantations established purely for the production of fiber provide a much narrower range of services than the original natural forest for the local people. India has sought to limit this damage by limiting the amount of land owned by one entity and, as a result, smaller plantations are owned by local farmers who then sell the wood to larger companies. Some large environmental organizations are critical of these high-yield plantations and are running an anti-plantation campaign, notably the Rainforest Action Network and Greenpeace.

See also
American Tree Farm System
Christmas tree cultivation
Even aged timber management
Forest farming
Wood industry

References

External links 
 American Tree Farm System History, Forest History Society
 American Tree Farm System Timeline, Forest History Society
 American Tree Farm System, American Forest Foundation
 Perth Tree Farm System, Australia Forest Foundation

Plantations
Forest management
Types of farms
Domesticated plants